Susanto Tirtoprodjo (3 March 1900 – 16 November 1969)  was the acting Prime Minister of the Republic of Indonesia (part of the United States of Indonesia from 20 December 1949 to 16 January 1950. He was also a member of the Investigating Committee for Preparatory Work for Independence (BPUPK) and served in a number of early Indonesian cabinets.

References 

1900 births
1969 deaths
Politicians from Central Java
Indonesian Muslims
Interior ministers of Indonesia
BPUPK
People from Surakarta